Edward Józef Kiedos (born 18 March 1961 in Wieluń) is a Polish politician. He was elected to Sejm on 25 September 2005, getting 6016 votes in 11 Sieradz districts as a candidate from the Samoobrona Rzeczpospolitej Polskiej list.

See also
Members of Polish Sejm 2005–2007

External links
Edward Józef Kiedos - parliamentary page - includes declarations of interest, voting record, and transcripts of speeches.

1961 births
Living people
People from Wieluń County
Members of the Polish Sejm 2005–2007
Self-Defence of the Republic of Poland politicians